Henri Fourie (born 13 April 1979) is a South African cricketer. He played in three first-class and five List A matches for Boland in 2004 and 2005.

See also
 List of Boland representative cricketers

References

External links
 

1979 births
Living people
South African cricketers
Boland cricketers